The Firebird Debute is a German single-place paraglider that was designed and produced by Firebird Sky Sports AG of Füssen in the mid-2000s. It is now out of production.

Design and development
The aircraft was designed as an advanced and competition glider. The models are each named for their relative size.

Variants
Debute L
Large-sized model for heavier pilots. The glider model is DHV 2-3 certified.

Specifications (Debute L)

References

Debute
Paragliders